The Peligran age is a period of geologic time (62.5–59.0 Ma) within the Paleocene epoch of the Paleogene, used more specifically with South American land mammal ages (SALMA). It follows the Tiupampan and precedes the Riochican age.

Etymology 
The age is named after the paleontological site Punta Peligro in Argentina.

Formations

Fossils

References

Bibliography 
Peñas Coloradas Formation
 
 

Bogotá Formation
 
 
 

Cerrejón Formation
 
 
 
 
 
 
 
 
 
 
 
 
 

Chota Formation
 
 

Guaduas Formation
 

Salamanca Formation
 
 
 
 
 

Santa Lucía Formation
 
 
 
 
 
 
 
 
 

 
Paleocene South America
Paleogene Argentina